The 1912 Maine gubernatorial election took place on September 9, 1912.

Incumbent Democratic Governor Frederick W. Plaisted was defeated for re-election by Republican candidate William T. Haines.

Results

Notes

References

Gubernatorial
1912
Maine
September 1912 events